The House of Lazarević (Lazarevići / Лазаревићи) was a Serbian medieval royal family, which ruled Moravian Serbia and the Serbian Despotate.

The dynasty began with Lazar Hrebeljanović, son of Pribac Hrebeljanović-a noble at the court of Dušan the Mighty. Lazar married Milica, supposedly a member of the reigning Nemanjić dynasty, and was later given the title "Knez" by Serbian Emperor Uroš the Weak. He gained lands in Central Serbia and through his ties with the Nemanjićs he became the regent of Moravian Serbia. In the Battle of Kosovo against the Ottoman Empire, Lazar was killed and Serbia became a vassal state, leading to the end of Serbian sovereignty.

Monarchs
Rulers of Moravian Serbia from 1371 to 1427.
Lazar Hrebeljanović (1371–1389)
Stefan Lazarević (1389–1427)

Family tree
 
Pribac
Draginja, who married Čelnik Musa, founder of Musić noble family
Lazar; Lazarevići
Ratoslava, who married Grand Župan Altoman Vojinović

Lazarević
Lazar married Princess Milica Nemanjic in around 1353 and had at least seven children:

 Mara, married Vuk Branković, founder of Branković dynasty in around 1371 and died April 12, 1426, 
 Stefan Lazarević (c. 1377 – July 19, 1427), Prince (1389–1402) and Despot (1402–1427), married Helene Gattilusio, daughter of Francesco II of Lesbos in 1405, granddaughter of Princess Maria Palaiologina, sister of the Byzantine emperor John V Palaiologos.
 Vuk, Prince, executed on July 6, 1410
 Dragana, married Emperor Ivan Shishman of Bulgaria in around 1386, died before July 1395
 Teodora, married Nicholas II Garay, Palatine of Hungary and member of powerful Garay family
 Jelena (Jela), married Đurađ II Stracimirović, Lord of Zeta and member of Balšić noble family, then Sandalj Hranić, Grand Duke of Bosnia and member of Kosača noble family and died March 1443,
 Olivera Despina (1372 – after 1444), married Ottoman Sultan Bayezid I in 1390

References

Sources
 
 
 
Veselinović, Andrija & Ljušić, Radoš (2001). Српске династије, Platoneum.
Fajfrić, Željko. Sveta loza kneza Lazara.
Marjanović-Dušanić, Smilja. "Dinastija i svetost u doba porodice Lazarević: stari uzori i novi modeli." Zbornik radova Vizantoloskog instituta 43 (2006): 77-97.

External links
 
The Holy bloodline of Prince Lazar by Željko Fajfrić 

 
Serbian royal families
14th century in Serbia